Hemistigma is a genus of dragonfly in the family Libellulidae. They are commonly known as pied-spots.

Species
The genus contains only two species:

References

Libellulidae
Anisoptera genera
Taxa named by William Forsell Kirby
Taxonomy articles created by Polbot